San Gabriel Mission High School is an all-girls Catholic College Preparatory  high school located on the grounds of the fourth mission of California, which was founded in 1771 by Franciscan priests and often used by Junipero Serra as his headquarters.  It is located in the Roman Catholic Archdiocese of Los Angeles.

History
San Gabriel Mission High School is a Catholic College Preparatory high school, located on the grounds of the fourth mission of California, which was founded in 1771 by the Franciscan Padres.  The Claretians began administration of the parish in 1908. The idea for the high school began in the mid-1940s and was the "vision of Father J. Nuevo, C.M.F., Mission San Gabriel pastor. With the need for a high school and the support of his parishioners, Father Nuevo had collected a sizable $245,000 toward the realization of the project." He was transferred in 1948 and his successor, Father Eugene Herran, C.M.F. "only enjoyed a pastorate for a few months, as his success in dealing with the complexities of the new school building project resulted in his election as General Treasurer of the Claretian Fathers."

On January 16, 1949, the groundbreaking ceremonies took place. San Gabriel Mission High School opened in September 1949 as a co-institutional school, under the direction of the Claretian Fathers and Dominican Sisters of Mission San Jose.  The freshmen class had 119 girls and boys, temporarily quartered in All Souls Grammar School in nearby Alhambra. In February 1950, the freshmen moved into their new building. The first principals were Father John Schneider, C.M.F. and Sister Mary Redempta Prose, O.P. "The staff numbered three priests, Fathers Schneider, C.M. F., Leo Mattecheck, C.M.F.  and Joseph Anglim, C.F.F. There were three sisters, Sisters Redempta, O.P., Columba Davalos, O.P. and Mary Raymond Carmody, O.P., and two lay teachers – Mr. John Hanrahan and Mrs. Leo Ryder." In October of that year, "Sister Maureen Murphy O.P. joined the sisters' community as an additional staff member."  Dedication ceremonies took place on January 14, 1951, with Most Reverend J. Francis McIntyre, Archbishop of Los Angeles, officiating.

The new school selected green and silver as the school colors, signifying hope and sterling worth.  In honor of the Mission's history, the student body chose "Pioneers" as the school name.  Clubs and activities organized during these first years include:  Student Council, Sodality, GAA, Glee club, Orchestra and Drama clubs.  The boys were able to join football, basketball, track, soccer, golf, bowling and tennis teams.  The girls participated in volleyball, basketball, and tennis.  Intramural sports, Play Day and Field Day became, and still are, annual events.  Dances, rallies, drama and musicals rounded out the activity schedule.

The students took part in dramatic plays and musicals.  The chorus began in 1950, when Mission students performed "Tribute to Stephen Foster".  For many years, the Drama Club and Glee Club were presented their operetta at the San Gabriel Mission Playhouse.  Plays performed in the high school auditorium include Bye Bye Birdie in the 1970s, Steel Magnolias in the 1980s, and later In Juliet's Garden, at the Grapevine Arbor.

In 1963, the Mission Band participated in the parade competition at the Annual Temple City Camellia Parade. And, in that same year the Boys Pioneer Basketball Team were in CIF for the seventh time and the Mission Soccer Team won League Title. Mission's athletic teams have included and continue to include CIF performances as well as Horizon League Championships.  In 2007, Mission TV went live on the internet and in 2009, the Cultural Room opened, where language clubs host meetings.

The following are the names of all of the principals of San Gabriel Mission High School:

1949-1951            Fr. John Schneider; S. Mary Redempta Prose

1951-1952            Fr. Leo Mattecheck; S. Rita Marie Brown

1952-1954            Fr. John Schneider; S. Rita Marie Brown

1954-1957            Fr. Leo Mattecheck; S. Rita Marie Brown

1957-1958            Fr. Leo Mattecheck; S. Alberta Oehlke

1958-1963            Fr. Leo Mattecheck; S. John Dominic Samaha

1963-1966            Fr. Henry Herrera; S. John Dominic Samaha

1966-1967            Fr. Matthew Di Maria; S. John Dominic Samaha

1967-1970            Fr. Matthew Di Maria; S. Mara Martin

1970-1971            S. Mara Martin

1971-1973            S. Katherine Jean Cowen

1973-1979            S. Mary Patrick English

1979-1987            S. Carolyn Kolander

1987-1988            S. Carolyn Kolander (on leave); Mr. Frank Laurenzello

1989-2000            Mr. Frank Laurenzello

2000-2006            Mrs. Carolyn Nelson

2006-2015            Mr. Jamie Collins

2015-2018            Dr. Marielle Sallo

2018-                    Ms. Raquel Cagigas, '96

When the Claretians withdrew from the school, San Gabriel Mission High School became solely an all-girls' school in the fall of 1971. It has maintained its full accreditation through the Western Association of Schools and Colleges since 1954.

In the Fall of 1994, the new chemistry lab was finished and in the Fall of 1996, the new Physical Science Lab was opened. In 1997 a chapel was completed. In the Fall of 1999, a new biology lab was completed.  Also, 2007 saw the opening of a new exercise room, which is currently under renovation. In addition, in 2008 a new floor was added to the auditorium; and, in 2009 a new dance studio was completed.

On April 5, 1981, the first San Gabriel Mission High School Alumni Association meeting was held in the Auditorium, under the direction of Sister Carolyn Kolander, Principal, and Sister Judith Mary, the class of '60.  James Taylor, ‘57 was elected as the first president.

Notable alumni include: Father Ralph Berg, CMF '53, returned to Mission as pastor in June 1978, serving the parish for three years in this capacity.  In 1981, he was sent to Nigeria to work in the Claretian missions and upon his return, served once again as pastor of Mission. Peter Mullin '58, businessman and owner of the Mullin Automotive Museum; Dr. Katherine Medvetz Poehlmann '60, author; Father Frank Ferrante, CMF '62, served as Provincial for the Claretian order; Katherine Burns Sartori ‘63, author; renowned soprano Alba Quezada ‘71 and mezzo-soprano, Suzanna Guzman ‘73; and Carol Najera Edwards '78, Deputy District Attorney. Also, alumni have returned to their Alma Mater showing their support.  In 1989, alumni Kenny Loggins ‘66, singer and song writer, helped SGMHS celebrate its 40th anniversary. In 2012, alumni Kim Baldonado ‘82, NBC news reporter, was the commencement speaker at graduation.

Academics
SGMHS is accredited by the WCEA/WASC and follows archdiocesan and state mandates.

San Gabriel Mission High School offers Enrichment Courses, SAT Prep, Personal College Admissions Advisement, Advanced Placement (AP) courses, the AP Capstone Program.

The school briefly held the International Baccalaureate (IB) programme.

Demographics
The current student population is +150 students. Student commute from various cities from the San Gabriel Valley and Greater Los Angeles Region.

Sports
As a member of the California Interscholastic Federation (CIF), the governing body for high school sports in the state of California, San Gabriel Mission High School is a member of the Horizon League. Sports at San Gabriel Mission High School include:
Basketball
Cross-Country
Soccer
Softball
Track and Field
Volleyball

Notable alumni
 Kenny Loggins - (1966) American singer and songwriter.

See also
 Mission San Gabriel Arcángel

References

External links

Roman Catholic secondary schools in Los Angeles County, California
Educational institutions established in 1949
Girls' schools in California
1949 establishments in California
Catholic secondary schools in California
San Gabriel, California
Junípero Serra